Table No. 21 is a 2013 Indian thriller film directed by Aditya Datt and produced by Eros International. It is named after Article 21 of the Indian Constitution, which talks about the protection of life and personal liberty. The movie features Rajeev Khandelwal, Tina Desai and Paresh Rawal and touches upon the pertinent social issue of ragging. The movie's soundtrack was composed by Gajendra Verma, Neeraj Shridhar and Sachin Gupta. The film performed above average at the box office.

Plot
Vivaan and Siya Agasthi struggle to make ends meet. The couple wins a trip to the beautiful island nation of Fiji in a lucky draw. The holiday is fully sponsored, with luxurious hotel accommodation and fine dinners. The duo flies to Fiji to celebrate their wedding anniversary and encounter the charming Mr. Khan at the resort. Mr. Khan invites the couple to participate in a live game show called Table No. 21. He tells them that the winner of the game bags a staggering amount of ₹210  million as prize money. He outlines the rules which are eight personal questions asked that must be answered truthfully, and following this, one must complete a task related to the question. The couple decides to enter the game show. At first, the questions seem easy, but as the game progresses, the tasks become increasingly horrific connected to their college life. Vivaan's final task is to murder an individual. He is led to a room, where he is to face his target. When he sees the person he must kill, he recognizes him from his past. A flashback shows Vivaan and his friends ragging a boy, named Akram. The severe bullying made Akram mentally challenged. Back in the present, it is revealed that Akram is Mr. Khan's son and that Mr. Khan's intention was to exact revenge and show Vivaan and Siya the damage inflicted on Akram by their actions. Mr. Khan tells them that they are free to go but their sins will follow them everywhere. The movie ends as Vivaan and Siya are still shocked – crying and regretting their choices.

Cast
 Paresh Rawal as Abdul Razaq Khan
 Rajeev Khandelwal as Vivaan Agasthi
 Tina Desai as Siya Agasthi
 Sana Amin Sheikh as Neeti
 Asheesh Kapur as Bittoo
 Dhruv Ganesh as Akram Khan
 Hanif Hilal as Ghouse (Khan's bodyguard)
 Seema Sheoran actress in Mann Mera song
 Manjunath Gaddi as a Chotu
Nishant malkani as masked man

Soundtrack

Reception
Critics have praised the story but have criticized the way the issue of ragging is kept under wraps. On review aggregator website Rotten Tomatoes, the film holds an audience approval rating of 54% based on 100+ reviews. Indiaglitz.com says that "Table No. 21 keeps you engaged right from start to the finish. If the beginning portions are frothy, middle portions turn thrilling, post-interval is dramatic and ultimately the narrative turns dark before reaching a shocking end." Ankur Pathak of Rediff.com says that "Table No. 21 should be watched for the reactive social commentary that it is and should not be misconceived as a vigilante film." Rated it 3 out of 5 stars. Madhureeta Mukherjee of The Times of India rated the film 3/5 
stars. Mansha Rastogi of Nowrunning.com says that "Table No. 21, although may not be a completely out of the box, never before concept but it's the execution of the story and the acting that makes this film a one-time watch."  Prasanth of Movieorange.com says that "Table No 21 is an excellent thriller, with a good message." Rated it 8 out of 10. Over the years the movie has been considered a cult movie for its unique concept.

Box office
Upon release, Table No. 21 saw a slow start at the Box Office in its first week. It collected ₹157.5 million net over the weekend, while the four-day collection was approximately ₹67.5 million net. The movie earned ₹101.0 million in the first week of its release, and after a two-week-long run, 2013′s first release stood at a total of ₹121.0 million in India and ₹180.0 million worldwide.

References

External links 

 
 Table No. 21 on Eros Now
 Table No. 21 on Voot

2013 films
2010s Hindi-language films
Films shot in Fiji
Films about suicide
Films about bullying
Indian adventure thriller films
Indian films about revenge
2010s adventure thriller films
Bullying in fiction
Films about mental health
Ragging
Films about social issues in India